Crystal Springs or Crystal Spring may refer to:

Bodies of water
Crystal Spring (Beaver County, Utah)
Crystal Spring (Box Elder County, Utah)

Populated places
Crystal Springs, Alberta
Crystal Springs, Arkansas
Crystal Springs, California, former name of Sanitarium, California
Crystal Springs, Florida
Crystal Springs, Kansas
Crystal Springs, Mississippi
Crystal Springs, Nevada
Crystal Springs, Ohio
Crystal Springs, Saskatchewan
Crystal Springs, West Virginia
Crystal Springs Dam
Crystal Springs Reservoir, located in San Mateo County, had a former name of Crystal Springs village

See also